Chiozza may refer to:

 Chiozza, part (frazione) of Castiglione di Garfagnana
 Chiozza, ancient name of Chioggia
 Chiozza, part (frazione) of Scandiano

See also 

 Chiozza (surname)